The World Youth Archery Championships, an international competition in archery,  have been held in alternate years since 1991  each time in a different host city. There are events in cadet and junior categories using the recurve and compound bows.

Editions
 World Youth Archery Championships

Champions

Since 2002, two classes have been contested at the Youth World Championships:
 Junior (under 20)
 Cadet (under 17)

Recurve Junior

Compound Junior

Recurve Cadet

Compound Cadet

References

 
Archery
Youth